"Fallin for You" is a song by American singer-songwriter Colbie Caillat. It was written by Caillat along with Rick Nowels and produced by Nowels, John Shanks, and Caillat's father, Ken Caillat, for her second studio album, Breakthrough (2009). The song was released on June 26, 2009, as the lead single from the album, through Universal Republic. According to Caillat, the song speaks of someone falling for a man that they are friends with.

The song was included on the international soundtrack of the Brazilian soap opera Viver a Vida (Portuguese for Seize the Day). "Fallin' for You"
is Caillat's fourth single to be included in a soap opera in Brazil. The first was "Bubbly" in Sete Pecados, the second was "Midnight Bottle" in Três Irmãs and the third was "Lucky" in Caras & Bocas.

The song was also featured on the 2010 Grammy Nominees album, representing the nomination that Caillat received for Best Pop Vocal Album at the 52nd Annual Grammy Awards

Chart performance
The song debuted at  12 to become Caillat's highest debut on the US Billboard Hot 100, the hot shot debut of the week and her most successful song on the US charts since her debut single "Bubbly". The song returned to the top 20 for two weeks, when her album debuted at No. 1, reaching No. 15. With 118,000 first-week downloads, it's also her first top 10 on the Hot Digital Songs chart since debut single "Bubbly" peaked at No. 4 in November 2007. On Billboards Hot Adult Contemporary Tracks, the song spent 14 weeks at No. 2, before rising to No. 1 the week of February 6, 2010. On the Canadian Hot 100, the song was the hot shot of the week, debuting at No. 55.

Music video
The video was released in July 2009 and was directed by The Malloys. It was filmed in Malibu, California. In the video, Caillat goes to the beach with a man, played by Bobby Moynihan, who is not her type (as she says during a phone call in the beginning of the video), but she starts to like him more and more over the course of the outing. At the end of the video when she sings the lyrics "Oh, I'm fallin' for you." the man pops out of the trailer asking, "Seriously? You mean it?" and Caillat nods, indicating that she has fallen for him.

Track listingsEuropean CD single "Fallin' For You" – 3:40
 "Hoy Me Voy" (featuting Juanes) – 3:22European maxi-CD single'
 "Fallin' For You" – 3:40
 "Hoy Me Voy" (featuring Juanes) – 3:22
 "Something Special" – 3:06
 "Turn Your Lights Down Low" (live) – 5:56

Charts and certifications

Weekly charts

Year-end charts

Certifications

Release history

See also
 List of number-one adult contemporary singles of 2010 (U.S.)

References

2009 singles
2009 songs
Colbie Caillat songs
Music videos directed by The Malloys
Song recordings produced by John Shanks
Song recordings produced by Ken Caillat
Song recordings produced by Rick Nowels
Songs written by Colbie Caillat
Songs written by Rick Nowels